Achurch (formerly Asenciran sometimes referred to as Thorpe Achurch) is a village in the civil parish of Thorpe Achurch, in North Northamptonshire, England. Situated on a small rise above the River Nene, 5 miles South of the market town of Oundle, the population of the civil parish of Thorpe Achurch at the 2011 census was 421.

The parish includes the Grade I listed property Lilford Hall and the Grade II* listed Church of St. John the Baptist, an early and late 13th-century Anglican church restored and enlarged by architect William Slater in 1862.

History
The villages name means 'Asa's church' or 'Asi's church'.

Settled successively since the Iron Age the village was named after the site of the nearby church as ’Aas-kirk’, meaning Church by the Water. Subsequently named  Asechirce in the Domesday Book of 1086 with land held mainly by Ascelin de Waterville, a Norman knight after whom the adjoining village of Thorpe Waterville is named. Ownership of the land passed through the Dukes of Exeter in the 14th century with Henry VII granting them to his mother Lady Margaret Beaufort. On her death the two manors of Thorpe Waterville and Achurch remained the property of the Crown until Henry VIII granted them to his illegitimate son Henry FitzRoy.

Edward VI awarded the manors to Sir William Cecil, later Lord Burghley, and they remained in the possession of his descendants the Earls of Exeter, until 1773, when the estates were sold to Thomas Powys of Lilford. Thomas Powys’ grandson was to be raised to the peerage as the first Lord Lilford in 1797.

Notable people
Robert Browne who had previously founded the Brownists, a forerunner of Congregationalism, was rector here from 1591 to 1631.
William Peake – born in Achurch in 1603, became Lord Mayor of London in 1686.
Edmund Quincy – ancestor of John Quincy Adams, sixth president of the United States, lived in the village prior to emigrating to America in 1633.

The village has lent its name to people's surnames who are believed to have originated from the village.

References

External links 
 
 A series of ten photographs and some further details of the village
 
 

Villages in Northamptonshire
North Northamptonshire